The Presses polytechniques et universitaires romandes (PPUR, literally "Polytechnic and university press of French-speaking Switzerland") is a Swiss academic publishing house.

It is based in Lausanne, on the Lausanne campus, in the Rolex Learning Center.

The Presses polytechniques et universitaires romandes has an English-language imprint called EPFL Press.

Publications 
The Presses polytechniques et universitaires romandes publish « Le savoir suisse » (literally "The Swiss knowledge"). This series was created in 2002 in collaboration with Bertil Galland. Between 2002 and 2012, it edited 88 books and sold 150'000 copies (in French). 28 of these books were translated, mainly in German.

Notes and references

External links 
 Official website
 

University presses of Switzerland
Publishing companies established in 1980
Swiss companies established in 1980